Jairon is a given name. It may refer to:

 Jairon Zamora (born 1978), Ecuadorian football midfielder
 Jairon (footballer) (born 1981), Jairon Feliciano Damásio, Brazilian football forward

See also
 Jairo